Ronald Björn Jensen (born April 1, 1936) is an American mathematician who lives in Germany, primarily known for his work in mathematical logic and set theory.

Career
Jensen completed a BA in economics at American University in 1959, and a Ph.D. in mathematics at the University of Bonn in 1964. His supervisor was Gisbert Hasenjaeger. Jensen taught at Rockefeller University, 1969–71, and the University of California, Berkeley, 1971–73. The balance of his academic career was spent in Europe at the
University of Bonn, the University of Oslo, the University of Freiburg, the University of Oxford, and the Humboldt-Universität zu Berlin, from which he retired in 2001. He now resides in Berlin.

Jensen was honored by the Association for Symbolic Logic as the first Gödel Lecturer in 1990. In 2015, the European Set Theory Society awarded him and John R. Steel the Hausdorff Medal for their paper "K without the measurable".

Results
Jensen's better-known results include the:
 Axiomatic set theory NFU, a variant of New Foundations (NF) where extensionality is weakened to allow several sets with no elements, and the proof of NFU's consistency relative to Peano arithmetic;
 Fine structure theory of the constructible universe L. This work led to his being awarded in 2003 the Leroy P. Steele Prize for Seminal Contribution to Research of the American Mathematical Society for his 1972 paper titled "The fine structure of the constructible hierarchy";
Definitions and proofs of various infinitary combinatorial principles in L, including diamond , square, and morass;
 Jensen's covering theorem for L;
 General theory of core models and the construction of the Dodd–Jensen core model;
 Consistency of CH plus Suslin's hypothesis.
 Technique of coding the universe by a real.

Selected publications

Articles
 Ronald Jensen, 1969, « On the Consistency of a Slight(?) Modification of Quine's NF », Synthese 19: 250–263. With discussion by Quine. 	
 The fine structure of the constructible hierarchy, Annals of Mathematical Logic, vol 4, Issue 3, August 1972, pp. 229–308 
 with Anthony J. Dodd: The core model, Annals of Mathematical Logic, vol 20, 1981, pp. 43–75. 
 with Anthony J. Dodd: The covering lemma for K, Annals of Mathematical Logic, vol 22, 1982, pp. 1–30. 
 Inner models and large cardinals. Bulletin of Symbolic Logic vol 1, Issue 4 (1995): 393-407. 
 with John R. Steel: K without the measurable, The Journal of Symbolic Logic, vol 78, Issue 3, 2013, pp. 708–734.

Books
 Modelle der Mengenlehre. Widerspruchsfreiheit und Unabhängigkeit der Kontinuumshypothese und des Auswahlaxioms. (Lecture Notes in Mathematics; vol. 37). Springer, Berlin 1967.
as editor with Alexander Pestel: Set theory and model theory: proceedings of an informal symposium held at Bonn, June 1–3, 1979. Berlin; New York: Springer-Verlag, 1981.
 with Aaron Beller and Philip Welch: Coding the Universe. Cambridge University Press, Cambridge 1982, .

References

External links
Jensen's page at the Humboldt-Universität zu Berlin.
Brief biographies of past presidents of the Kurt Gödel Society.

1936 births
Living people
American logicians
20th-century American mathematicians
21st-century American mathematicians
American University alumni
Set theorists
University of Bonn alumni
Tarski lecturers
Hausdorff Medal winners
American emigrants to Germany
Gödel Lecturers